"" (Tender Love), WoO 123, or "", is a love song by Ludwig van Beethoven that he composed in 1795 and first published in 1803. Beethoven was 25 years old when he wrote it. The song is occasionally referred to by its first line, "".

History
Though Alexander Thayer put the date of composition to be 1797–98 in Thayer's Life of Beethoven, recent research has found that "" was probably composed in 1795. 1795 was a turning point in Beethoven's career, since he was starting to become noticed by nobility and his works were becoming more popular. He had lived in Vienna for two years, and had studied with composers such as Haydn.

"" was first published in 1803 by Johann Traeg in Vienna, one year before Beethoven's 3rd symphony. It was published along with "", WoO 124.

Text
In the poem, the narrator expresses love for another, saying how their love lets them share sorrow and comfort.

Ich liebe dich, so wie du mich,
Am Abend und am Morgen,
Noch war kein Tag, wo du und ich
Nicht teilten unsre Sorgen.

Auch waren sie für dich und mich
Geteilt leicht zu ertragen;
Du tröstetest im Kummer mich,
Ich weint' in deine Klagen.

Drum Gottes Segen über dir,
Du, meines Lebens Freude.
Gott schütze dich, erhalt' dich mir,
Schütz und erhalt' uns beide.
I love you as you love me,
At evening and at morning,
No day there was when you and I
Did not share our sorrows.

And for me and you they were,
When shared, an easy burden;
You comforted me in my distress,
I wept when you lamented.

May God then bless you,
You, my life's delight.
God protect and keep you for me,
Protect and keep us both.

References

External links 
 
 Poem, translation, and short biography of Karl Friedrich Wilhelm Herrosee, bachlund.org
 , Dietrich Fischer-Dieskau, Jörg Demus

Compositions by Ludwig van Beethoven
1795 compositions
1790s songs